Land and Development Bank of South Africa (LADBSA) is a government-owned development bank in the Republic of South Africa. The bank was established as a development finance institution in 1912 by the Government of South Africa. The main objective of LADBSA is to promote and finance development in the agricultural sector of the economy of the country.

See also

 List of banks in South Africa
 Economy of South Africa
 List of banks in Africa
 Pretoria

References

External links
 Website of LADBSA

Banks of South Africa
Banks established in 1912
Government-owned companies of South Africa
Organisations based in Pretoria
1912 establishments in South Africa
Agricultural organisations based in South Africa
Companies based in the City of Tshwane